Boxing magazine The Ring has awarded world championships in men's professional boxing within each weight class from its foundation in 1922 until the 1990s, and again since 2001. In 2019 they began awarding world championships to women, however, the publication did not begin producing monthly female divisional rankings until August 2020.

Middleweight

Junior middleweight

Welterweight

Junior welterweight

Lightweight

Flyweight

See also

List of current female world boxing champions
List of WBA female world champions
List of WBC female world champions
List of WBO female world champions
List of IBF female world champions

External links
Official list of current Ring champions
https://boxrec.com/media/index.php/The_Ring_Magazine%27s_Annual_Ratings

Female world champions
Ring female world champions
Ring

Women's boxing
Ring